Karl Hischier (21 January 1925 – 21 August 2016) was a Swiss cross-country skier who competed in the 1950s. He finished 17th in the 50 km event at the 1952 Winter Olympics in Oslo. He was born in Oberwald.

References

External links
 Olympic 50 km cross country skiing results: 1948-64

Olympic cross-country skiers of Switzerland
Cross-country skiers at the 1952 Winter Olympics
Swiss male cross-country skiers
Swiss military patrol (sport) runners
1925 births
2016 deaths
20th-century Swiss people